Arthur Edward Clarence Hodgson (8 January 1926 – 12 May 2003) was an Australian rules footballer who played in the Victorian Football League (VFL) and North Western Football Union (NWFU). Born in Sydney but raised in Queenstown, Tasmania, Hodgson was recruited by the Carlton Football Club in Victoria, playing 76 games and winning the Robert Reynolds Trophy as club best and fairest in 1950. He returned to Tasmania in 1953 as captain-coach of the Ulverstone Football Club, piloting the Robins to four premierships and one state premiership (the first by a coastal team) in his seven-year tenure; individually, he won the Wander Medal as league best and fairest in 1955. Hodgson was named in the Tasmanian Team of the Century and was inducted into the Tasmanian Hall of Fame.

References

External links
 
 
 Profile at Blueseum

1926 births
2003 deaths
Carlton Football Club players
John Nicholls Medal winners
Ulverstone Football Club players
Australian rules footballers from New South Wales
Australian rules footballers from Tasmania
Tasmanian Football Hall of Fame inductees